Servetism refers to the theology of Michael Servetus, which affirms that Christ was God manifested in the flesh, yet not as part of a tri-personal God, and that he did not exist previously as the Son, but as the divine Logos (the manifestation of God, or the Word of God) that became the Son after incarnation.

Servetus believed strongly in the unity of God and in the Divinity of Christ, but denied that the doctrine of the trinity of persons was the way to support these two essentials of Christian doctrine. He looked to the study of the Bible for answers, and he did not find the traditional Trinitarian doctrine affirmed there. Rather than seeing a traditional Trinitarian view reflected in the Bible, he saw confirmation of the idea that God manifested himself in the human form of Jesus Christ. 

In the preamble to his book, Christianismi Restitutio (1553), he says, "There is nothing greater, reader, than to recognize that God has been manifested as substance, and that His divine nature has been truly communicated to mankind. It is in Christ alone that we shall fully apprehend the manifestation of God Himself through the Word, and His communication to mankind through the spirit."

Although he was a pioneer in this unique view of God he is often lumped in with Unitarian or Arian theology. His view of God is very similar to those of the New Church and Oneness Pentecostals.

See also
 Michael Servetus
 Nontrinitarianism
 Justus Velsius

Nontrinitarianism